CSS Grand Duke, a steamer built at Jeffersonville, Indiana in 1859, was outfitted as a cotton-clad gunboat for service with the Confederate States Army in February 1863.

Grand Duke transported troops to Fort Taylor, Louisiana late in February 1863. Her speed, turning power, and superior piloting allowed Grand Duke to escape up river.

On May 4, 1863 Grand Duke and Mary T. were taking on guns, ordnance stores, and other public property prior to the evacuation of Fort DeRussy when a Union reconnaissance force that included , Estrella, and Arizona hove into view.  In the ensuing hour-long engagement, each of the principal contestants sustained damage, but the Union ships withdrew, allowing the Confederates to remove their materiel further up the Red River and to delay the Federal advance by obstructing the river. Grand Duke was ordered to Shreveport, Louisiana where she burned late in 1863.

References

	

Gunboats of the Confederate States Navy
History of Shreveport, Louisiana
Ships built in Jeffersonville, Indiana
1859 ships
Shipwrecks of the American Civil War
Cottonclad warships
Maritime incidents in September 1863